Hilarempis polychaeta is a species of dance flies, in the fly family Empididae.

References

Hilarempis
Insects described in 1905
Taxa named by Mario Bezzi